Koyuk Alfred Adams Airport  is a state-owned public-use airport located in Koyuk, a city in the Nome Census Area of the U.S. state of Alaska.

Facilities 

Airlines and destinations 

Prior to its bankruptcy and cessation of all operations, Ravn Alaska served the airport from multiple locations.

References

External links 
 FAA Alaska airport diagram (GIF)
 

Airports in the Nome Census Area, Alaska